The following is the list of bishops of the Archdiocese of St. Louis.  The Roman Catholic Church in the United States comprises 195 dioceses led by diocesan bishops.  Auxiliary bishops serve in association with the diocesan bishops in larger dioceses.  There are thirty-two ecclesiastical provinces, each headed by a metropolitan archbishop, of which the Archbishop of Saint Louis is one.  As of November 2010, five of the metropolitan archbishops of this see have been designated cardinals: John Joseph Glennon (1946), Joseph Ritter (1961), John Carberry (1969) Justin Francis Rigali (2003; as archbishop of Philadelphia), and Raymond Leo Burke (2010; as prefect of the Supreme Tribunal of the Apostolic Signatura).

In addition to the 195 dioceses, there are several other dioceses in the nation's overseas dependencies.  There are also dioceses and eparchies of the Eastern Catholic Churches.  A special archdiocese was created by the Vatican for the United States military.  Such bodies are also organized into metropolitan provinces of their own.

All bishops in the United States and the U.S. Virgin Islands, diocesan and auxiliary, are members of the United States Conference of Catholic Bishops. Bishops in Puerto Rico form their own Episcopal Conference. Those from insular areas in the Pacific Ocean are members of the Episcopal Conference of the Pacific.

St. Louis archdiocesan hierarchy

Archbishops
Joseph Rosati, C.M.: March 20, 1827 – September 25, 1843
Peter Richard Kenrick: September 25, 1843 – May 21, 1895
John Joseph Kain: May 21, 1895 – October 13, 1903
John Joseph Glennon: October 13, 1903 – March 9, 1946
Joseph Ritter: July 20, 1946 – June 10, 1967
John Carberry: March 25, 1968 – July 31, 1979
John Lawrence May: January 24, 1980 – December 2, 1992
Justin Francis Rigali: March 16, 1994 – July 15, 2003
Raymond Leo Burke: January 26, 2004 – June 27, 2008
Robert James Carlson: April 21, 2009 – June 10, 2020
Mitchell Thomas Rozanski: June 10, 2020 – Present

Succession chart

Auxiliary Bishops
Christian Herman Winkelmann: September 13, 1933 – December 27, 1939
George Joseph Donnelly: March 19, 1940 – November 9, 1946
John Cody: May 10, 1947 – January 27, 1954
Charles Herman Helmsing: March 17, 1949 – August 24, 1956
Leo Christopher Byrne: May 21, 1954 – February 11, 1961
Glennon Patrick Flavin: April 17, 1957 – May 29, 1967
George Joseph Gottwald: June 23, 1961 – August 2, 1988
Joseph Alphonse McNicholas: January 31, 1969 – July 22, 1975
Charles Roman Koester: January 2, 1971 – September 10, 1991
Edward Thomas O'Meara: January 28, 1972 – November 21, 1979
John Nicholas Wurm: June 25, 1976 – September 19, 1981
Edward Joseph O'Donnell: December 6, 1983 – November 8, 1994
James Terry Steib, S.V.D.: December 6, 1983 – May 5, 1993
Paul Albert Zipfel: May 16, 1989 – December 31, 1996
Edward Kenneth Braxton: May 17, 1995 – February 21, 2001
Michael John Sheridan: July 8, 1997 – December 4, 2001
Joseph Fred Naumann: July 8, 1997 – January 7, 2004
Timothy Michael Dolan: June 19, 2001 – June 25, 2002
Robert Joseph Hermann: October 16, 2002 – December 1, 2010
Edward Matthew Rice: December 1, 2010 – April 26, 2016
Mark Steven Rivituso: March 7, 2017 – Present

References

See also
Roman Catholic Archdiocese of St. Louis
List of the Catholic bishops of the United States
List of the Catholic cathedrals of the United States
List of the Roman Catholic dioceses of the United States

List of bishops
Saint Louis
Bishops
Roman Catholic bishops in Missouri